Levi Casey may refer to:

 Levi Casey (politician) (1752–1807), General, United States Representative from South Carolina
 Levi Casey (athlete) (1904–1983), American triple jumper